Tevaughn Shaquele Campbell (born June 14, 1993) is a Canadian professional football cornerback for the Jacksonville Jaguars of the National Football League (NFL). He played CIS football for the Regina Rams. He played four seasons in the Canadian Football League (CFL) before moving to the United States to play in the NFL.

University career
Campbell played CIS football for the Regina Rams from 2011 to 2014.

Professional football career

Canadian Football League
Campbell was originally drafted by the Calgary Stampeders in the third round, 22nd overall, in the 2015 CFL Draft. After playing in five games in 2015 with the Stampeders, Campbell was traded to the Roughriders on February 11, 2016 in exchange for a fourth-round pick in the 2017 CFL Draft.

On August 15, 2017, Campbell, along with the Roughriders' third round picks in the 2018 CFL Draft and 2019 CFL Draft, was traded to the Montreal Alouettes for Vernon Adams and a fifth round pick in the 2018 CFL Draft.

New York Jets (NFL)
On January 4, 2019, Campbell signed a reserve/future contract with the New York Jets of the NFL. He was waived on August 31, 2019.

Los Angeles Chargers (NFL)
On September 11, 2019, Campbell was signed to the Los Angeles Chargers practice squad. He was promoted to the active roster on October 29, 2019, but was waived four days later and re-signed to the practice squad. He was promoted back to the active roster on November 25, 2019. He was waived on December 9, 2019 and re-signed to the practice squad. He signed a futures contract with the Chargers on December 30, 2019.

In Week 11 against his former team, the New York Jets, Campbell intercepted a pass thrown by Joe Flacco and returned it for a six yard touchdown during the 34–28 win.  This was Campbell's first NFL interception and touchdown.

On August 23, 2022, Campbell was released by the Chargers. He was placed on injured reserve two days later. He was released on September 13.

Las Vegas Raiders
On October 17, 2022, Campbell was signed to the Las Vegas Raiders practice squad.

Jacksonville Jaguars
On October 26, 2022, Campbell was signed by the Jacksonville Jaguars off the Raiders' practice squad. He re-signed with the Jaguars on March 16, 2023.

Rugby career
Campbell trained with the Canada national rugby sevens team during the 2016-17 World Rugby Sevens Series stops in Hong Kong and Singapore.

References

External links 
 Los Angeles Chargers bio
 Saskatchewan Roughriders bio

1993 births
Living people
Canadian football defensive backs
Sportspeople from Scarborough, Toronto
Canadian football people from Toronto
Players of Canadian football from Ontario
Saskatchewan Roughriders players
Regina Rams players
Calgary Stampeders players
Montreal Alouettes players
New York Jets players
Footballers who switched code
Canadian players of American football
American football cornerbacks
Los Angeles Chargers players
Las Vegas Raiders players
Jacksonville Jaguars players